Myron James Magnet (born August 31, 1944) is an American journalist and historian. He was the editor of City Journal from 1994 to 2007. His latest book, Clarence Thomas and the Lost Constitution, was  published in 2019 by Encounter Books.

Biography
Magnet served as editor of City Journal from 1994 to 2007 and is now its editor-at-large. Under his editorship, the magazine helped shape Rudy Giuliani's agenda as mayor of New York City. Before that, Magnet was a longtime member of the Board of Editors at Fortune magazine, a publication for which he wrote numerous articles on social policy, management, and finance, in addition to publishing essays and op-eds in The New Criterion, The Claremont Review of Books, The Wall Street Journal, and The New York Times, among other publications.

President George W. Bush has cited Magnet's 1993 The Dream and the Nightmare: The Sixties' Legacy to the Underclass, as a profound influence on his approach to public policy. The central premise of the book is that culture powerfully shapes economic and social outcomes, and the dramatic cultural transformation that the United States experienced during the 1960s unintentionally created an entrenched underclass, whose social pathologies are still with us. His widely praised  The Founders at  Home  recounts the story of the American Founding from the Zenger trial to the Battle of New Orleans through a series of vivid biographies that aim to explore each Founder's ideas and worldview as well as his actions.
Encounter Books published his latest work,  Clarence Thomas and the Lost Constitution,  in May 2019. Former U.S. Attorney General Michael Mukasey deemed it "A great read, . . . fascinating and provocative"; historian Richard Brookhiser called it "splendid" and "riveting"; and Michael Goodwin praised it as "a very readable gem,. . . a brilliant road map.”  Of Magnet’s first book,  Dickens and the Social Order  (1985), the New York Times stated: “Perhaps he will consider writing a sequel; even if it turned out to be only half as good as Dickens and the Social Order, it would be very well worth reading.”

In November, 2008, President Bush awarded Magnet the National Humanities Medal "for scholarship and visionary influence in renewing our national culture of compassion. He has combined literary and cultural history with a profound understanding of contemporary urban life to examine new ways of relieving poverty and renewing civic institutions." 

Magnet graduated from Phillips Exeter Academy in 1962.  He holds bachelor's degrees from both Columbia University (1966) and the University of Cambridge, as well an M.A. from Cambridge and a Ph.D. in English Literature from Columbia University, where he also taught for several years.

Bibliography
Books written
 Clarence Thomas and the Lost Constitution (Encounter, 2019)
 The Founders at Home: The Building of America, 1735–1817 (W. W. Norton, 2013)
 The Dream and the Nightmare: The Sixties' Legacy to the Underclass (William Morrow, 1993,  / Encounter Books, 2000)
 Dickens and the Social Order (University of Pennsylvania Press, 1985,  / ISI Books, 2004)
Books edited
 The Immigration Solution: A Better Plan than Today's (Ivan R. Dee, 2007)
 Modern Sex: Liberation and its Discontents (Ivan R. Dee, 2001)
 What Makes Charity Work? A Century of Public and Private Philanthropy (Ivan R. Dee, 2000)
 The Millennial City: A New Urban Paradigm for 21st-Century America (Ivan R. Dee, 2000)

References

External links
 Official Website: MyronMagnet.com
 
 Boston Athenaeum speech, November 19, 2013
 Archive of City Journal columns
 "Magnet's Milestone", The New York Sun, December 29, 2006
 Ken Ringle, "The Hard Heart Of Poverty; Bush's 'Compassionate Conservative' Guru Sees Culture as Culprit", The Washington Post, April 3, 2001
 Myron Magnet, "What Is Compassionate Conservatism?" The Wall Street Journal, February 5, 1999

1944 births
Living people
American magazine editors
American political writers
Phillips Exeter Academy alumni
National Humanities Medal recipients
20th-century American historians
21st-century American historians
20th-century American male writers
Manhattan Institute for Policy Research
American male non-fiction writers
21st-century American male writers
Columbia College (New York) alumni
Alumni of the University of Cambridge
Columbia Graduate School of Arts and Sciences alumni